These are the official results of the Men's Pole Vault event at the 1991 IAAF World Championships in Tokyo, Japan. There were a total number of 31 participating athletes, with two qualifying groups and the final held on Thursday August 29, 1991.

Medalists

Schedule
All times are Japan Standard Time (UTC+9)

Results

Qualifying round
Qualification: Qualifying Performance 5.60 (Q) or at least 12 best performers (q) advance to the final.

Final

See also
 1988 Summer Olympics (Seoul)
 1990 European Championships (Split)
 1992 Summer Olympics (Barcelona)
 1994 European Championships (Helsinki)

References
 Results

P
Pole vault at the World Athletics Championships